The Blitz defence is a defensive technique used in rugby union. It was brought to prominence by Shaun Edwards, the head coach of London Wasps. The Blitz defence relies on the whole defensive line moving forward towards their markedman as one as soon as the ball leaves the base of a ruck or maul. The charge is usually led by the inside centre.

The idea of this technique is to prevent the attacking team gaining any ground by tackling them behind the gain line and forcing interceptions and charged-down kicks. However, the defending team can be vulnerable to chip kicks and any player breaking the defensive line will have much space to play because the defence are running the other way and must stop, turn and chase. In many ways, the blitz is similar to the defence used in rugby league which can be explained by Edwards's background in that code.

It has however, paid dividends for London Wasps with the team winning the Heineken Cup in 2003-04 and 2006–07, the Premiership title in 2003, 2004, 2005 and 2008 and the Anglo-Welsh Cup in 2006.
Not only this, but this style of defence played a significant role in the 2008 Six Nations Grand Slam for the Welsh national team, who conceded only two tries over five games.

The term blitz defence is derived from a defensive play in American Football, where the defence players (usually Linebackers) pile forward against the offensive line en masse in the hope of tackling the Quarterback while he is still in possession of the ball.

References

External links
Shaun in Defensive Mode

Rugby union terminology